Malcolm John Gaskill FRHistS (born 22 April 1967) is an English academic historian and writer on crime, magic, witchcraft, spiritualism, and the supernatural. Gaskill was a professor in the history department of the University of East Anglia from 2011 until 2020, when he retired from teaching to give more time to writing.

Early life
Born in Suffolk, Gaskill grew up in Kent. He was educated at Rainham Mark Grammar School and Robinson College, Cambridge, reading History and graduating Ph.D. with a thesis on early modern England supervised by Keith Wrightson.

Career
Gaskill was briefly at Keele University as a lecturer for the year 1993–1994, and then at Queen’s University Belfast for the next academic year, before spending four years at Anglia Ruskin University. After that, he joined Churchill College, Cambridge, as a fellow and as Director of History Studies. In 2007, he transferred as a lecturer to the School of History of the University of East Anglia, where he was appointed as a professor in 2011. 

In 2010, he was a visiting fellow in North American studies at the British Library, while researching his book Between Two Worlds.

Gaskill’s academic interests are in the cultural and social history of Britain and North America, especially the history of crime, magic, and witchcraft, between 1500 and 1800, and in 20th-century spiritualism and supernatural phenomena, with a focus on  psychical research from 1920 to 1950. He has written chiefly about the history of witchcraft and witch-hunts.

His book Witchfinders: a Seventeenth-Century English Tragedy (2006) is a study of the witch-hunts of 1645–1647 in East Anglia.

While at the University of East Anglia, Gaskill was available to supervise research students interested in social and cultural history in the early modern period in England, especially on topics related to witchcraft and mentalities.

The New York Times called Gaskill’s The Ruin of All Witches (2021), about a real life witch hunt in Springfield, Massachusetts, "a riveting history of life in a 17th-century New England frontier town", noting that a man’s nightmare had led to his being accused of witchcraft, flowing out of the colonists’ isolation stress, disease, and death.

In 2022, the book was shortlisted for a Wolfson History Prize, with the judges calling it "a riveting micro-history, brilliantly set within the broader cultural and social history of witchcraft." By this time, Gaskill was a full-time writer.

Retirement 
In 2018, his wife accepted a job in Dublin and he was able to take a year out to look after their children, finding that he did not miss academic life. In May 2020, during the first Covid-19 lockdown, Gaskill settled his early retirement from his teaching position, noting that universities were already "far from the sunlit uplands" and that they seemed to be about to "descend into a dark tunnel". His retirement was complete a few months later, and he explained his disillusion in an article in London Review of Books.

Books
Hellish Nell: Last of Britain's Witches (Fourth Estate, April 2001) 
The Matthew Hopkins Trials, ed. (London: Pickering and Chatto, 2003: vol. 3 in James Sharpe and Richard M. Golden, eds., Writings on English Witchcraft 1560-1736, 6 vols.
Crime and Mentalities in Early Modern England (Cambridge University Press, 2000) 
Witchfinders: A Seventeenth-Century English Tragedy (John Murray Press, April 2006; Harvard University Press, October 2007) 
Witchcraft: A Very Short Introduction (Oxford University Press, 2010) 
Between Two Worlds: How the English Became Americans (Basic Civitas Books, 2013; Oxford University Press, 2014) 
The Ruin of All Witches: Life and Death in the New World (London: Allen Lane, November 2021)

Some other publications
 "Witchcraft and power in early modern England: the case of Margaret Moore" in Women, Crime and the Courts in Early Modern England (Routledge, 1994) 125-145 
 "Witches and witchcraft prosecutions, 1560-1660" in M. Zell, ed., Early Modern Kent 1540-1640 (Woodbridge: The Boydell Press, 2000) 245-277
 "Witchcraft" in Arthur F. Kinney, David W. Swain, Eugene D. Hill, eds., Tudor England: An Encyclopaedia (Garland Publishing, 2000)
 "Witches and Witnesses in old and New England" in S. Clark, ed., Languages of Witchcraft: Narrative, Ideology and Meaning in Early Modern Culture (Macmillan, 2001) 55-80 26 p
 "Time's Arrows: Context and Anachronism in the History of Mentalities" in Scientia Poetica 10 (December 2006), 237-253
 "Witchcraft, Politics and Memory in Seventeenth-Century England" in The Historical Journal 50, 2 (June 2007), 289-308
 "Witchcraft and evidence in early modern England" in Past and Present 198 (2008), 33-70
 "Witchcraft, emotion and imagination in the English civil war" in J. Newton, J. Bath, eds., Witchcraft and the Act of 1604 (Brill, 2008)
 "The Pursuit of Reality: Recent research into the reality of witchcraft" in The Historical Journal 51, 4 (December 2008), 1069–1088 
 "Masculinity and witchcraft in seventeenth-century England" in A. Rowlands, ed., Witchcraft and Masculinities in Early Modern Europe (Palgrave, 2009)
 "Fear made flesh: the English witch-panic of 1645-7" in D. Lemmings, C. Walker, eds., Moral Panics, the Press and the Law in Early Modern England (Palgrave, 2009)
 "Witchcraft and Neighbourliness in Early Modern England" in S. Hindle, ed., Remaking English Society: Social Relations and Social Change in Early Modern England (2013)
 "Little commonwealths II: communities" in K. Wrightson, ed., A Social History of England, 1500-1700 (Cambridge University Press, 2017)
 "Afterword: Passions in Perspective" in L. Kounine, M. Ostling, eds., Emotions in the History of Witchcraft (Basingstoke: Palgrave Studies in the History of Emotions, 2017), 269–279
 "The Fear and Loathing of Witches" in S. Page, M. Wallace, eds., Spellbound: Magic, Ritual and Witchcraft (Ashmolean Museum, 2018)

Honours
Fellow of the Royal Historical Society

Notes

External links
Malcolm Gaskill, Crime and Mentalities in Early Modern England: Contents, Introduction (Cambridge University Press, 2000)
  "Witchcraft", (In Our Time, 21 October 2004), BBC Radio 4, with Alison Rowlands, Lyndal Roper and Malcolm Gaskill
"Witchcraft Expert Malcolm Gaskill Breaks Down Famous Witches in Films & TV", YouTube

1967 births
Academics of Anglia Ruskin University
Academics of Queen's University Belfast
Academics of the University of East Anglia
Alumni of Robinson College, Cambridge
Fellows of Churchill College, Cambridge
Historians of witchcraft
Living people
People educated at Rainham Mark Grammar School
Fellows of the Royal Historical Society
English non-fiction writers